The Ministry of Gender is a ministry in Zambia. It is headed by the Minister of Gender.

The ministry was established in 2012 by combining the Gender in Development Division of the Cabinet Office with the Child Development department of the Ministry of Community Development, Mother and Child Health. However, in 2016 Child Development was transferred to the Ministry of Sport, Youth and Child Development and the ministry was renamed the Ministry of Gender.

List of ministers

Deputy ministers

References

External links
Official website

Gender
Gender in Zambia
 
Zambia
Women's rights in Zambia